Macrogomphus lankanensis is a species of dragonfly in the family Gomphidae. It is endemic to Sri Lanka.  Its natural habitats are rivers and irrigated land. It is threatened by habitat loss.

References

Sources

Dragonflies of Sri Lanka
Gomphidae
Taxonomy articles created by Polbot
Insects described in 1933